The Tondano rat (Taeromys taerae) is a species of rodent in the family Muridae.
It is found only in Indonesia. Taeromys taerae is found in the highlands of northeastern Sulawesi. The rat is a morphological relative of T. hamatus, which is found only in central Sulawesian mountains.

References

Taeromys
Rats of Asia
Rodents of Sulawesi
Endemic fauna of Indonesia
Vulnerable fauna of Asia
Mammals described in 1932
Taxonomy articles created by Polbot